Il gattopardo may refer to:

The Leopard, a novel
The Leopard (1963 film), a film based on the novel